Gymnastics competitions at the 2021 Junior Pan American Games in Cali, Colombia were held from November 26 to December 5, 2021.

Medal summary

Medal table

Medalists

Artistic gymnastics

Men's events

Women's events

Rhythmic gymnastics

Individual

Group

Trampoline

See also
2021 Junior Pan American Artistic Gymnastics Championships
2021 Junior Pan American Rhythmic Gymnastics Championships
2021 Pan American Gymnastics Championships
Gymnastics at the 2020 Summer Olympics

References

Gymnastics
Pan American Games
Qualification tournaments for the 2023 Pan American Games